This article is about the 2007 season of the Celtic Crusaders.

2007 Season summary

National League Two table

2007 Season players

2007 Signings/Transfers
Gains

Losses

Re-Signings

References

Jesus

Celtic Crusaders Rugby League season
Crusaders Rugby League seasons
2007 in Welsh rugby league